The 2020 Challenger Ciudad de Guayaquil is a professional tennis tournament played on clay courts. It is the sixteenth edition of the tournament which is part of the 2020 ATP Challenger Tour. It will take place in Guayaquil, Ecuador between 16 and 23 November 2020.

Singles main-draw entrants

Seeds

 1 Rankings are as of 9 November 2020.

Other entrants
The following players received wildcards into the singles main draw:
  Gonzalo Escobar
  Diego Hidalgo
  Antonio Cayetano March

The following players received entry from the qualifying draw:
  Hernán Casanova
  Jesper de Jong
  Oriol Roca Batalla
  Thiago Agustín Tirante

Champions

Singles

 Francisco Cerúndolo def.  Andrej Martin 6–4, 3–6, 6–2.

Doubles

 Luis David Martínez /  Felipe Meligeni Alves def.  Sergio Martos Gornés /  Jaume Munar 6–0, 4–6, [10–3].

References

2020 ATP Challenger Tour
2020
2020 in Ecuadorian sport
November 2020 sports events in South America